The 1970–71 SM-sarja season was the 40th season of the SM-sarja, the top level of ice hockey in Finland. 12 teams participated in the league, and Ässat Pori won the championship.

First round

Final round

External links
 Season on hockeyarchives.info

Fin
Liiga seasons
1970–71 in Finnish ice hockey